Nautiliniellidae is a family of polychaetes belonging to the order Phyllodocida.

Genera:
 lascarpia
 Iheyomytilidicola
 Laubierus

References

Phyllodocida